Sandværet is an island group in the municipality of Herøy in Nordland county, Norway. The main populated islands in the group include Nordøya, Innerøya, Ytterøya, Langøya, and Gråøya. Sandvær Chapel serves the islands and has several worship services each year.

See also
List of islands of Norway

References

Islands of Nordland
Herøy, Nordland